Established in 1989, Petra National Trust (PNT) is a registered Jordanian nongovernmental (not-for-profit) organization whose function is to promote the preservation, protection, and conservation of the UNESCO World Heritage Site of Petra. PNT has coordinated preservation projects and studies on such issues as the Nabataean hydrological systems, biodiversity, the geophysical stability of the Siq, and the unique Nabataean wall painting at Beidha. It has also implemented projects related to site management and zoning, capacity building for employees of the Petra Archaeological Park (PAP), and the safeguarding of Petra's natural heritage. Princess Majda Ra'ad was one of the trust's founding members.

PNT also works with local communities to raise awareness about the cultural and natural values of Petra.

References

Non-profit organisations based in Jordan
Petra